The 1941 All-Ireland Senior Camogie Championship was the high point of the 1941 season in Camogie. The championship was won by Cork, who defeated Dublin by a 21-point margin in the final.

Structure
Dublin were in isolation from the camogie establishment, the sole remaining members of the "old association" since mid-1939 but one Dublin club had affiliated to the central Council of the Camogie Association and represented the county, Great Southern Railway, which had two young players who were to become the leading exponents of the game in their generation, Kathleen Cody and Kathleen Mills. 
In the All Ireland semi-final at Breffni Park the CIE Dublin team drew with Cavan, who had won a delayed Ulster championship because of difficulties getting the Ulster final played in wartime conditions. When it took place on 14 September, Cavan, who had earlier defeated Fermanagh and Monaghan, beat Antrim 2–3 to 1–2. The following week they played Dublin in the All Ireland semi-final in Breffni Park, Rita Sullivan scoring Cavan's fourth goal and the equalising score in the final seconds of play.
Four points from Kathleen Cody and goals from Sheila Cunningham, Laura Blunn and May Neville helped Dublin to a 3–4 to 1–4 semi-final victory over Cavan in the replay at Inchicore. Ann Fitzpatrick scored Cavan's goal at the beginning of the second half. It was a robust match in which two players retired injured in the first half. While the Anglo Celt reported "Cavan were quick to appreciate the worth of the opposition and their spoiling tactics effectively cramped the overhead style of the Dublin cailíní, which, if allowed to develop, might have brought serious developments." 
the ''Irish Independent" reported,
referee Peg Morris had difficulty controlling a game which also produced the unedifying spectacle of girls indulging in fisticuffs.

Final
Kitty Buckley scored six goals in Cork's victory. Maureen and Patty Hegarty were the first twins to win All-Ireland medals. Dublin full-back Tess Leahy, was the first Kilkenny woman to play in an All-Ireland final. Her brother, Terry, scored the winning point for Kilkenny in the 1947 All-Ireland hurling final.

Final stages

 
Match Rules
50 minutes
Replay if scores level
Maximum of 3 substitutions

See also
 All-Ireland Senior Hurling Championship
 Wikipedia List of Camogie players
 National Camogie League
 Camogie All Stars Awards
 Ashbourne Cup

References

External links
 Historical reports of All Ireland finals

1941 in camogie
1941